Kitty Marion 12 March 1871 – 9 October 1944) was born Katherina Maria Schäfer in Germany. She emigrated to London in 1886 when she was fifteen, and she grew to minor prominence when she sang in music halls throughout the United Kingdom during the late 19th century. She became known in the field for standing up for female performers against agents, corruption, and for better working conditions. She joined the Women's Social and Political Union (WSPU) in 1908, engaged in selling their newspaper Votes for Women and became a prominent suffragette in the United Kingdom for her participation in civil unrest protests including riots and arson. As a result, Marion was arrested many times and is known for having endured 232 force-feedings while on hunger strike in prison. She is quoted as saying “there are no words to describe the horrible revolting sensation.” When World War I started she emigrated to the United States, and there she joined the team on Margaret Sanger’s Birth Control Review. Although she used her tenacity and loud voice to get people to pay attention to her cause, she did not use violence as much as she had in the United Kingdom, although she was still arrested many times for advocating birth control.

Early years
Katherina Maria Schafer was born in Rietberg in Westphalia, Germany, on 12 March 1871. Her mother died of tuberculosis when the child was two, leaving Marion with her father. Four years later, when Marion was six, her step-mother also died of tuberculosis. Her father, whose name was Gustav (see Riddell, Death in Ten Minutes), abused Marion and hated that she had red hair. When Marion was fifteen, she was secretly sent by her German uncle to live with her aunt in England, to escape her father's violence (see Riddell).

Career

Actress
From when she was a child, Marion had liked to sing and dance. While in school, she was quoted as saying, "[A]t singing and reciting I excelled simply because it came easily to me and I loved it." Shortly after she moved to England to live with her aunt, she started performing on the pantomime stage. She found a natural home in London music halls, where variety shows included songs and skits that commented on current events. It was a more open, diverse, and informal environment of artists compared to the rest of Victorian England. When she started singing in the halls, her roles were so small that she did not even appear on the program, but she eventually moved her way up through the chorus and minor roles to become the understudy for lead roles in performances that toured the UK such as The Lady Slavery.

Marion's more significant contribution to the music hall industry was rebelling against the corrupt system that permitted assaults against women within it. The working conditions for performers were harsh, and Peter Bailey has criticized the creation of the "more or less professionalized labor force". The exploitation was very sexist, as women were expected to perform sexual favors in exchange for jobs. Marion recalls in her unpublished autobiography one of these encounters with an agent called Mr. Dreck. During a meeting about a performance opportunity Dreck tried to kiss her. She resisted, fell, and hit her head. He told her that she would not be able to succeed if she continued to stop sexual advances from men in power. In 1906 she joined the Actor's Association and the Variety Artists Federation (VAF) where she was outspoken about the treatment of female performers. In the same year she gained public recognition when she wrote a response letter to the London Era newspaper after they published actors' lack of loyalty to their agents. Marion wrote that she had "given up hope for a woman who wants to earn her own living, and at the same time rise in the profession on her merits only, without influence of any sort."  Over the next six weeks many other women wrote describing their own experiences. Her involvement with the suffrage movement harmed her career in the UK because of her damaged reputation. Agents did not want to cause scandals. Conversely, performance opportunities increased when she moved to the United States, but she was not able to work because of her time spent with the Birth Control Review.

Activist

While advocating for performers, Marion was drawn to the Suffragette Movement. She joined the Women's Social and Political Union (WSPU) in 1908 and the Actresses Franchise League (AFL) in 1909. Her first role at the WSPU was selling their newspaper, Votes for Women, on the streets. Although she initially did not like doing it, eventually she became comfortable with her job and developed into one of the best members according to Barbara Green. Marion embraced the militant activism the WSPU used, and participated in processions during which police officers became violent against them. She threw bricks into windows of post offices, grocery stores, and once threw a package of suffragette literature through the window of the Home Office. She handled many terrorist arson attacks and bombings, not intended to hurt people, in churches and train carriages. They did not cause as much damage as current bombs do because the bombs smoked before they detonated, giving people time to get away. She once submitted a false fire alarm for inspection and refused to pay a fine. She would rather serve jail time, so she went to jail for a month with the support of other suffragettes. Her most notorious act was burning down the Hurst Park Race grandstand on June 8, 1913 with Clara Giveen. She was sentenced to three years in prison, and it was there she received extensive force feeding. While in prison, many suffragettes would go on hunger strike, so the prison staff would hold them down and insert tubes down the nostrils, mouth, or throat while liquid food was poured. Sometimes it would be administered so incorrectly it would cause stabbing pain or even loss of consciousness. Marion was administered this 232 times, sometimes three times a day. She remembered it to be "hellish torture," but after she was released from prison, she was only more motivated from her experiences.

Marion received a Hunger Strike Medal for valour from the WSPU.

Marion had to leave the United Kingdom at the start of World War I because of anti-German sentiment, and with the help of influential suffragettes she was able to emigrate to the United States. She met Margaret Sanger at Carnegie Hall, and started working with her selling Sanger's magazine, the Birth Control Review. She became a familiar New York figure as she would be standing in Times Square to Coney Island, selling diligently. It was a form of protest as well as education, because it forced people to pay attention to what she was talking about. She filled this position for 13 years, and although her actions were not as militant as they were in the UK, she was still arrested many times. In November 1918 she spent thirty days in jail for selling a pamphlet to a Vice Society member. There she met Agnes Smedley, a political dissident. Smedley remembers Marion coming down the hallway every morning yelling "Three cheers for birth control." She returned to England briefly to see the unveiling of a statue of Mrs. Pankhurst, but because of this trip she was dismissed from the Birth Control Review. When she came back to the United States, she started working at the Speech Improvement Project at the WPA where she helped children learn English.

Marion died in the Sanger Nursing Home in New York City on 9 October 1944.

Further Information 
Marion compiled a scrapbook of her suffrage activities which has been digitised.

See also
Suffragette bombing and arson campaign

Notes

References
Engelman, Peter C. (2011), A History of the Birth Control Movement in America,  ABC-CLIO,  .
Riddell, Fern (2018), Death in Ten Minutes: The forgotten life of radical suffragette Kitty Marion, Hodder & Stoughton, .

1871 births
1944 deaths
American birth control activists
American feminists
American socialists
American women's rights activists
Free speech activists
German emigrants to England
English emigrants to the United States
19th-century English people
British people of World War I
English women in politics
British women's rights activists
English feminists
English suffragists
Feminism and history
British socialist feminists
English socialists
People from the Province of Westphalia
Hunger Strike Medal recipients